The 1995 Mid Suffolk District Council election took place on 4 May 1995 to elect members of Mid Suffolk District Council in England. This was on the same day as other local elections.

Summary

|}

References

1995 English local elections
May 1995 events in the United Kingdom
1995